Nancy Jo Cullen is a Canadian poet and fiction writer, who won the 2010 Dayne Ogilvie Prize from the Writers' Trust of Canada for an emerging lesbian, gay, bisexual or transgender writer. The jury, consisting of writers Brian Francis, Don Hannah and Suzette Mayr, described Cullen in the award citation as a writer "who feels like a friend", and who "tackles dark corners without false dramatics or pretensions. There is a genuine realness in her language."

Originally from British Columbia and a longtime resident of Calgary, Alberta, she now lives in Kingston.

As of the time of her Dayne Ogilvie win, she had published three volumes of poetry. Her short story "Ashes" was a finalist for the Journey Prize in 2012, and she has since published a full volume of short stories and a novel.

She served on the jury for the 2015 Dayne Ogilvie Prize, selecting Alex Leslie as that year's winner.

In 2020 her novel The Western Alienation Merit Badge was a shortlisted finalist for the Amazon.ca First Novel Award, and in 2021 it was shortlisted for the 2020 ReLit Award for fiction.

Works
Science Fiction Saint (2002, poetry)
Pearl (2006, poetry)
Untitled Child (2009, poetry)
Canary (2013, short stories)
The Western Alienation Merit Badge (2019, novel)

References

External links
Nancy Jo Cullen

Canadian women poets
Canadian lesbian writers
Writers from British Columbia
Writers from Calgary
Living people
21st-century Canadian poets
Canadian LGBT poets
Canadian women short story writers
Year of birth missing (living people)
21st-century Canadian women writers
21st-century Canadian short story writers
21st-century Canadian novelists
Canadian women novelists
Canadian LGBT novelists
Lesbian novelists
21st-century Canadian LGBT people